Whitney-on-Wye is a village and civil parish in Herefordshire, England, roughly a mile east of the border with Wales. The population of this civil parish at the 2011 census was 117. It is on the A438 road, and on the River Wye. The church is dedicated to the Saints Peter and Paul.

History 
Whitney-on-Wye was first mentioned in the Domesday Book with the spelling Witenie. The most plausible meaning for the name is White Water, from the Anglo-Saxon hwit (white) and ey (water), and probably refers to the River Wye which runs through the area and which can become a torrent when heavy rains in the Welsh mountains cause it to swell.

During the Captain Swing riot movement of 1830, Whitney was a site in Herefordshire for protest by the dispossessed farm labourers who threatened arson and machine breaking to try to obtain a living wage. On 17 November 1830, Henry Williams, a 'ranting' preacher and journeyman tailor wrote a threatening letter to a large farmer citing the fires that had been set in the barns of those who had ignored the poor in the county of Kent. For his pains he was sentenced to transportation to New South Wales.

See also 
Whitney-on-Wye toll bridge

References

External links

Villages in Herefordshire